Charles Hansen may refer to:

Charles Hanses Hansen  (c. 1659 – c. 1697), English Member of Parliament for Winchester
Charles Robert Hansen (1909-2000), American businessman and politician
Chuck Hansen (1947–2003), American historian of the atom bomb
Chas. H. Hansen Music Corp., American music publisher founded by Charles Henry Hansen in 1952
Charles D. Hansen, American computer scientist
Charles M. Hansen (born 1938), American chemist and deviser of Hansen Solubility Parameters
Charles Hansen (cyclist) (1891–?), Danish cyclist at the 1912 Olympics

See also
Charles Hanson (disambiguation)
Hansen (surname)